German submarine U-643 was a Type VIIC U-boat of Nazi Germany's Kriegsmarine during World War II. The submarine was laid down on 1 December 1941 at the Blohm & Voss yard at Hamburg, launched on 20 August 1942, and commissioned on 8 October 1942 under the command of Oberleutnant zur See Hans-Harald Speidel.

Attached to 5th U-boat Flotilla based at Kiel, U-643 completed her training period on 30 June 1943 and was assigned to front-line service.

Design
German Type VIIC submarines were preceded by the shorter Type VIIB submarines. U-643 had a displacement of  when at the surface and  while submerged. She had two shafts and two  propellers.

U-643 was fitted with five  torpedo tubes (four fitted at the bow and one at the stern), fourteen torpedoes, one  SK C/35 naval gun, 220 rounds, and one twin  C/30 anti-aircraft gun. The boat had a complement of between forty-four and sixty.

Service history

On 8 October 1943, while operating against convoy SC 143, U-643 was detected by Liberator R of No. 86 Squadron RAF. The aircraft strafed the U-boat but had to return to base short on fuel. Another British aircraft, Liberator Z of the same squadron, continued the attack on U-643, which attempted to dive. Four depth charged were dropped in the wake of the diving U-boat, which resulted in an oil spill. Liberator Z returned to the convoy, only to return an hour later to find Liberator T of No. 120 Squadron RAF attacking an U-boat, which turned out to be U-643. The two aircraft attacked with depth charges and strafed the U-boat. When two more Liberators arrived at the scene, the U-boat's crew prepared to abandon ship. Upon arrival of the destroyer  the U-boat was scuttled, 18 survivors were picked up by Orwell.

References

Bibliography

External links

World War II submarines of Germany
German Type VIIC submarines
1942 ships
Ships built in Hamburg
U-boats commissioned in 1942
U-boats scuttled in 1943
World War II shipwrecks in the Atlantic Ocean